Mustoe House is a historic home located near Hot Springs, Bath County, Virginia. The log structure was built in three sections in the early- to mid-19th century.  They are a two-story front section, a -story log hyphen, and a separate -story log structure. It has a large exterior-end limestone chimney. Also on the property is a contributing small log spring house or meathouse.

It was listed on the National Register of Historic Places in 2002.

References

Houses on the National Register of Historic Places in Virginia
Houses completed in 1813
Houses in Bath County, Virginia
National Register of Historic Places in Bath County, Virginia
U.S. Route 220
1813 establishments in Virginia